Arnold Payne was a cricketer.

Arnold Payne may also refer to:

Arnold Payne (athlete), Zimbabwean runner
Arnold Payne, one of the hoaxers collectively known as Martian Monkey
Arnold Payne, candidate in Bulawayo Central (Parliament of Zimbabwe constituency)